Munich South is an electoral constituency (German: Wahlkreis) represented in the Bundestag. It elects one member via first-past-the-post voting. Under the current constituency numbering system, it is designated as constituency 219. It is located in southern Bavaria, comprising the southern part of the city of Munich.

Munich South was created for the inaugural 1949 federal election. Since 2021, it has been represented by Jamila Schäfer of the Alliance 90/The Greens.

Geography
Munich South is located in southern Bavaria. As of the 2021 federal election, it comprises the boroughs of Sendling (6), Sendling-Westpark (7), Obergiesing (17), Untergiesing-Harlaching (18), Thalkirchen-Obersendling-Forstenried-Fürstenried-Solln (19), and Hadern (20) from the independent city of Munich.

History
Munich South was created in 1949. In the 1949 election, it was Bavaria constituency 7 in the numbering system. In the 1953 through 1961 elections, it was number 202. In the 1965 through 1976 elections, it was number 207. In the 1980 through 1998 elections, it was number 206. In the 2002 and 2005 elections, it was number 221. In the 2009 and 2013 elections, it was number 220. Since the 2017 election, it has been number 219.

Originally, the constituency comprised the boroughs of Altstadt, Au, Forstenried, Fürstenried, Hadern, Isarvorstadt, Ludwigsvorstadt, Obersendling, Sendling, Solln, and Thalkirchen. In the 1965 through 1972 elections, comprised the boroughs of Forstenried, Fürstenried, Giesing, Hadern, Harlaching, Obersendling, Thalkirchen, Sendling, and Solln. In the 1976 election, it lost the borough of Sendling and gained the borough of Mittersendling. It acquired its current borders in the 2002 election.

Members
The constituency was first represented by Max Wönner of the Social Democratic Party (SPD) from 1949 to 1953. Karl Wieninger of the Christian Social Union (CSU) was elected in 1953 and served until 1965. Günther Müller of the SPD won the constituency in 1965 and served until 1972. He was succeeded by fellow SPD member Rudolf Schöfberger from 1972 to 1976. Erich Riedl won the constituency for the CSU in 1976, and served until 1998. Christoph Moosbauer of the SPD was elected in 1998 and was representative for a single term. Peter Gauweiler regained it for the CSU in 2002 and served until 2017. Michael Kuffer of the CSU was elected in 2017. Jamila Schäfer won the constituency for the Greens in 2021.

Election results

2021 election

2017 election

2013 election

2009 election

References

Federal electoral districts in Bavaria
1949 establishments in West Germany
Constituencies established in 1949
Munich